The 1946 Ukrainian Cup was a football knockout competition conducting by the Football Federation of the Ukrainian SSR and was known as the Ukrainian Cup.

Competition schedule

First elimination round 
Most games of the round took place on 29 September 1946.

Second elimination round 
The main date for games was on 6 October 1946.

Third elimination round 
The main date for games was on 13 October 1946.

Fourth elimination round 
The main date for games was on 20 October 1946.

Quarterfinals

Semifinals 
All games were played in Kyiv.

Final

Top goalscorers

See also 
 Soviet Cup
 Ukrainian Cup

Notes

References

External links 
 Information source 

1946
Cup
1946 domestic association football cups